Zürich Airport railway station is a railway station serving Zurich Airport in Switzerland. The station is located underneath the Airport Centre, the main ground-side passenger terminal of the airport, which is in the canton of Zürich and the municipality of Kloten.

History 
When Zürich Airport first opened in 1948, the nearest railway was the single-track line from Oerlikon to Effretikon, forming a loop off the original main line of the Zürich to Winterthur line. In 1980 and in order to improve access to the airport, a new main line was constructed between Oerlikon and Effretikon. The new line passed under the airport terminal, and the airport railway station was opened. Originally the station was planned to be served only by intercity trains, but it is now served by a mixture of long distance and suburban trains.

The previous line from Oerlikon through Kloten Balsberg and Kloten to Bassersdorf was retained, and is used by suburban trains that do not call at the airport and freight trains. The section from Bassersdorf to Effretikon was abandoned, and trains off the Kloten line now join the new line for this section of their journey. Other suburban trains use the original main line through Dietlikon.

Layout and facilities 
The station is situated on the airport railway line between Oerlikon and Effretikon, which forms one variant of the Zürich to Winterthur main line. The platforms are linked to the Airport Centre, which contains the station ticket office, by escalators and lifts. The Airport Centre also contains several floors of retail and catering facilities, as well as access, via check-in and security, to the Airside Center and gate lounges.

Summary of track usage:

 Track 1: EuroCity, IC1, IC5, IR13 towards ; S2 towards .
 Track 2: IC8, IR75, S24 towards Winterthur.
 Track 3: IC1, IC8, IC81, IR13, IR75, S16 towards Zürich HB.
 Track 4: IC5, IR36, S24 towards Zürich HB.

The airport terminal complex also includes a bus station, served by regional bus lines, and a station on the Stadtbahn Glattal light rail system, served by Zürich tram routes 10 and 12. These can be accessed from the station via the Airport Centre.

Operation 
The station is served by approximately 300 trains per day, formed of a mixture of EuroCity (EC) InterCity (IC) and InterRegio (IR) trains, serving cities throughout Switzerland, as well as Zürich S-Bahn trains on lines S2, S16 and S24. Most trains also serve Zürich Hauptbahnhof, the city's main railway station, with, for most of the day, some 13 trains per hour (tph) taking between 9 and 13 minutes for the journey.

The airport station is also linked to Konstanz station, just over the border in Germany, by an hourly Swiss InterRegio train. Several daily EuroCity trains call at the airport station en route from Zürich Hauptbahnhof to Bregenz, in Austria, and various German cities as far as Munich.

Services 
 the following services stop at Zürich Airport:

 EuroCity: service every two hours between Zürich Hauptbahnhof and München Hauptbahnhof.
 InterCity:
 InterRegio:
 Zürich S-Bahn:

Gallery

See also

History of rail transport in Switzerland
Rail transport in Switzerland
ZVV

References

External links 
 
 

Airport railway stations in Switzerland
Railway stations in the canton of Zürich
Swiss Federal Railways stations
Railway stations in Switzerland opened in 1980